Geysaran (also Romanized as Geysārān) is a village in Poshtkuh Rural District, Falard District, Lordegan County, Chaharmahal and Bakhtiari Province, Iran. At the 2006 census, its population was 115, in 23 families. The village is populated by Lurs.

References 

Populated places in Lordegan County
Luri settlements in Chaharmahal and Bakhtiari Province